Gragnano is a municipality in the Metropolitan City of Naples in southern Italy's Campania. 

Gragnano may also refer to:
 Gragnano, frazione of Capannori, municipality in the Province of Lucca in the Italian region Toscana
 Gragnano, frazione of Sansepolcro, municipality in the Province of Arezzo in the Italian region Toscana
 Gragnano Trebbiense, municipality in the Province of Piacenza in the Italian region, Emilia-Romagna
 Gragnano Products, Inc., an American food company
 Società Sportiva Calcio Gragnano, an Italian association football club based in Gragnano, Campania